St. Kilda is a former unincorporated community in southern Alberta, Canada within the County of Warner No. 5. It is located south of Highway 500 on Township Road 12-1A, southeast of the Town of Milk River, and east of the Village of Coutts.

Education
West Butte School District No. 2747 was formed May 25, 1912 at township 11-1-12-W4. Originally named West Butte, the name was changed to St. Kilda No. 2747 in 1920.

See also 
 List of communities in Alberta

Ghost towns in Alberta
Localities in the County of Warner No. 5